Dozdaksu (also Romanized as Dozdaksū; also known as Dozdak) is a village in Ahandan Rural District, in the Central District of Lahijan County, Gilan Province, Iran. At the 2006 census, its population was 43, in 10 families.

References 

Populated places in Lahijan County